The Demon Hunters Role Playing Game is a role-playing game published by Margaret Weis Productions in 2008.

History
Three new Cortex System media games were published by Margaret Weis Productions, one each year between 2007 and 2009, including the Battlestar Galactica Role Playing Game (2007), the Demon Hunters Role Playing Game (2008), and the Supernatural Role Playing Game.

Description
The Demon Hunters Role Playing Game was based on the films Demon Hunters and Demon Hunters: Dead Camper Lake by Dead Gentlemen Productions.

References

Margaret Weis Productions games
Role-playing games based on films
Role-playing games introduced in 2008